Maranatha Christian School (MCS), is a co-ed, non-denominational Christian school with campuses spread out between Doveton, Victoria, Officer, Victoria, and Endeavour Hills, Victoria.

Curriculum 
Maranatha provides education for all year levels, from kindergarten to Year 12.

MCS also offers the Victorian Certificate of Education (VCE), to Year 10,Year 11 and Year 12 students along with the Victorian Certificate of Applied Learning (VCAL).

References

External links 
 

Nondenominational Christian schools in Victoria (Australia)
Educational institutions established in 1970
1970 establishments in Australia
Buildings and structures in the City of Casey
Buildings and structures in the Shire of Cardinia